is a railway station on the Hokuriku Main Line in the city of Tsuruga, Fukui Prefecture, Japan, operated by the West Japan Railway Company (JR West).

Lines

Station layout
The station consists of two opposed unnumbered side platforms connected by a level crossing. The station is unattended.

Platforms

Adjacent stations

History
Shin-Hikida Station opened on 1 October 1957. With the privatization of Japanese National Railways (JNR) on 1 April 1987, the station came under the control of JR West. A new station building was completed in October 2006.

Station numbering was introduced in March 2018 with Shin-Hikida being assigned station numbers JR-A02 for the Hokuriku Main Line and JR-B09 for the Kosei Line.

Passenger statistics
In fiscal 2016, the station was used by an average of 23 passengers daily (boarding passengers only).

Surrounding area

See also
 List of railway stations in Japan

References

External links

  

Railway stations in Fukui Prefecture
Stations of West Japan Railway Company
Railway stations in Japan opened in 1957
Hokuriku Main Line
Tsuruga, Fukui